The 2015 Elite League speedway season was the 81st season of the top division of UK speedway and the nineteenth season of the Elite League that took place between March and October 2015. The Poole Pirates were the defending champions after winning their second consecutive title in 2014.

Summary
Both the Birmingham Brummies and the Eastbourne Eagles elected to ride in the National League in 2015, meaning the Elite League featured just 8 teams as opposed to the 10 teams that started the 2014 season.

The Poole Pirates won the Elite League for a record third successive year, beating the Belle Vue Aces in the two-legged Grand Final. The Aces – in their first Grand Final since 2005 – hosted the first leg at Kirkmanshulme Lane, and at one point trailed by 13 points. However, a tactical ride (offering double points) from Matej Žagar started their comeback, and despite trailing by 10 with 3 heats to go, the Aces managed to secure a 46–46 draw. At Poole Stadium, the Pirates repeated their fast start and the Aces could not gain the lead at any point during the meeting; in the penultimate heat, Kacper Gomólski sealed the title for Poole, the Pirates ultimately winning 92–90 on aggregate.

As well as winning the overall championship, the Pirates finished the regular season with the most points for the second season in succession, while the team also won the Elite Shield at the start of the season, defeating the King's Lynn Stars 96–85 on aggregate. The Elite League Riders' Championship was won by Australian rider Jason Doyle, a member of the Leicester Lions team.

Regulation changes
At the annual Elite League AGM, which was held in November 2014, it was announced that the points limit for the top 5 members of the teams would be raised from 32 to 34. It was also decided that the fixture list for 2015 would be compiled in a matter which was described as "sympathetic" to riders competing in the Grand Prix series, with no fixtures to be ridden in the week prior to a Grand Prix. The effect of this was to potentially result in more of the top riders in World Speedway returning to race in the Elite League in the future. However, there was a visa issue for non-EU riders, meaning that many American and Australian riders were unable to race in the Elite League, unless the issue was resolved.

Teams

Personnel and stadia

Results
Teams faced each other four times: twice home and away. The first of the home and away meetings were called the 'A' fixtures, and the second were the 'B' fixtures.

'A' Fixtures

'B' Fixtures

Final league table

Play-offs

Draw

Semi-finals

Grand Final

Final leading averages

Riders & final averages
Unless otherwise stated, all listed riders were declared at the start of the 2015 Elite League season.

Belle Vue

 8.03
 7.92
 7.86
 6.98

 6.52
 4.93

Coventry

 8.34
 8.09
 7.45
 7.29
 6.84

 5.23

King's Lynn

 9.09

 7.65
 7.15
 6.24
 5.23

 4.21

Lakeside

 8.40
 7.24
 7.16

 6.63
 6.63
 4.89

Leicester

 9.39
 7.29

 6.49
 5.97

 3.69

Poole

 9.38
 8.41
 7.86

 6.72
 6.70
 5.34

Swindon

 7.70
 7.55
 7.42

 6.63

 3.73

Wolverhampton

 7.16
 7.13
 6.58
 6.37
 5.97
 5.11
 4.34

Notes

See also
List of United Kingdom Speedway League Champions

References

SGB Premiership
Elite League
Speedway Elite